Pitball is a video game developed and published by Warner Interactive Europe for the PlayStation.

Gameplay
Pitball is a game about a sport that includes elements from hockey, football, and basketball, and takes place in an intergalactic theater.

Reception

IGN spotlighted the graphics and music, highlighting the intro, traps, weapons, and special moves, but claimed the experience was brought down by very long load times, confusing button configurations, and the amount of time it takes for a playable character to stand up once knocked down.

Critics frequently noted the multi-player mode to be more fun than single-player.

References

1996 video games
Accolade (company) games
Fantasy sports video games
PlayStation (console) games
PlayStation (console)-only games
Video games developed in the United Kingdom